"Twelfth Night" is the 41th episode of the second season of the Australian anthology TV series Wednesday Theatre and is based on the the play  of the same name by William Shakespeare. "Twelfth Night" aired on ABC Television network on 12 October 1966 in Sydney, on 26 October 1966 in Melbourne, and on 16 November 1966 in Brisbane. The play was directed by Ken Hannam and it starred Roger Climpson and Helen Morse.

Cast

Reception
The Bulletin called it "lively" with "a high standard of acting, diction, and intelligence".

The Sydney Morning Herald wrote there was "some gracious acting" but added "regrets remain for the inadequate way in which everything else was presented".

References

External links
 

1966 television plays
1966 Australian television episodes
1960s Australian television plays
Wednesday Theatre (season 2) episodes
Films directed by Ken Hannam